My Head was an American grunge/alternative rock power trio from Los Angeles, California, United States, formed in 1993 by singer-songwriter and guitarist Adam Siegel and drummer Greg Saenz. Due to its member's past on Excel, My Head's sound was influenced by early 1980s Crossover Thrash music, but also by the growing grunge movement impulsed by bands like Nirvana, Pearl Jam and Soundgarden. Even after its dissolution My Head recorded three tracks for two different Mike Muir's releases: Pneumonia (EP later included on the album Mas Borracho by Infectious Grooves) and Friends & Family, Vol. 2 by Suicidal Tendencies.

History 
My Head was founded in early 1993 after Adam Siegel and Greg Saenz left Excel indefinitely and Dave Silva joined as bassist, but Adam's appearances on Infectious Grooves's albums repeatedly interrupted the progress of the project. It was not until 1994 that they could get a recording contract, however the label (Imago Records) went out of business eight months later. In 1995 the band had its second chance and signed a new contract with Capitol Records. Then they began playing at several clubs around Hollywood like Dragonfly, Martini Lounge, Spaceland, Bar DeLuxe, Opium Den and coffee houses. The April 16, 1996 My Head brought to market its first and only studio album Endless Bummer, the record consisted of twelve tracks and was released on CD format and cassette tape. Saenz described the album as "a hard-hitting soul – rock, a 90's version of Grand Funk". Even though the album didn't make it to the charts, it had some commercial success in California and environs. Soon after My Head filmed a music video of the single Humbucker (previously released on April 1) at EMI studios, it debuted on VH1. After some management changes, the firm started pushing the band to add new members, modify its image and even its name; to worsen the situation EMI began supporting nu metal bands more than anything else; in an interview Saenz said: "they were getting huge egos and bank accounts managing Korn, and hyping their new band, Limp Bizkit [...] then told us to add a D.J., another guitarist, and change our name to The Peking Logs". Due to these conflicts My Head broke the contract with Capitol and disbanded on January 1, 1998.

Members 
 Adam Siegel – guitar, lead vocals (1993–1998)
 Dave Silva – bass (1994–1998)
 Greg Saenz – drums (1993–1998)

Discography

Endless Bummer 
Endless Bummer is the first and only My Head's studio album. The record was released the April 16, 1996. Its recording and distribution was handled by Capitol Records. This album is notable for its heavy guitar riffs influenced by psychedelic and funk rock that allude to bands like Alice in Chains and Cream.

Track listing

Single 
The only single taken from the album was the track "Humbucker". It was released on April 1, 1996. Later that month, My Head filmed the music video for this song at EMI studios; it later debuted on VH1.

Personnel

Other appearances

References

External links
 My Head Official MySpace

Musical groups established in 1993
Musical groups disestablished in 1998
Alternative rock groups from California
American grunge groups
Musical groups from Los Angeles
1993 establishments in California